The 1983 Open Championship was a men's major golf championship and the 112th Open Championship, held from 14 to 17 July at Royal Birkdale Golf Club in Southport, England. It was the sixth time the course had hosted, with the first in 1954.

Defending champion Tom Watson won his fifth Open Championship, one stroke ahead of runners-up Andy Bean and Hale Irwin. It was his second consecutive Open win and third in the last four, but was helped by Irwin "whiffing" a one-inch putt on the 14th hole on the third day, which cost him a chance of a play-off with Watson for the tournament.

At age 33, this was Watson's eighth and final major title; he had won three of the last six majors, but had not won any event for twelve months.

Watson was the fifth to win five Open Championships, last accomplished in 1965 by Peter Thomson, also at Royal Birkdale. He was the first to successfully defend the title in over a decade, since Lee Trevino in 1972 at Muirfield. Of his five Open wins, this was the only one outside Scotland.

Seven years earlier at Royal Birkdale in 1976, defending champion Watson posted an 80 in the third round, finishing with a pair of sixes, and missed the 54-hole cut by a stroke.

Past champions in the field

Made both cuts

Source:

Missed the first cut

Source:

Round summaries

First round
Thursday, 14 July 1983

Source:

Second round
Friday, 15 July 1983

Source:
Amateurs: Parkin (+5), Gilford (+7), Plaxton (+12), Thompson (+12), Wood (+12), Hamer (+13), Thomas (+13), Crosby (+17).

Third round
Saturday, 16 July 1983

Source:

Final round
Sunday, 17 July 1983

Source:

References

External links
Royal Birkdale 1983 (Official site)
112th Open Championship - Royal Birkdale (European Tour)

The Open Championship
Golf tournaments in England
Open Championship
Open Championship
Open Championship